The Entracque Power Plant, also known as The Upper Gesso Plant, is a pumped-storage hydroelectric power station located in Valle Gesso just south of Entracque, Italy. The power station contains pump-generators for two co-located but hydraulically separated power schemes; the Chiotas-Piastra Plant and Rovina-Piastra Plant. Both plants use separate upper reservoirs but use Lago della Piastra as their common lower reservoir. To produce power, water is released from the upper reservoirs to the power station located at the lower reservoir. The pump-generators re-fill the reservoirs and the process repeats as needed. The Chiotas' upper reservoir, Lago del Chiotas, is located much higher in the valley and larger than Rovina's Lago della Rovina which affords it the ability to produce more electricity. Construction on the plant began in 1962 and operations started in 1982. It is owned and operated by Enel.

Design and operation

The Entracque Power Plant is supported by a scheme that also primarily consists of three reservoirs. The lower reservoir used by both the Chiotas and Rovina is Lago della Piastra. The pumping is carried out by the power station's nine Francis pump turbine-generators, eight belong to Chiotas and one to Rovina. When either of the upper reservoirs needs to be filled, water is pumped from Piastra to the Chiotas or Rovina upper reservoirs through a series of penstocks and tunnels. This usually occurs during periods of low energy demand, such as at night, when electricity is cheap.

The storage capacity of the reservoir is  while  can be used for power generation.

When power generation is required, water is released from either upper reservoir back down to the power station and its generators. The power station is located underground and consists of transformer, valve gallery and generator hall caverns. Water from the Rovina is processed by a single  generator. Both the tail-race and power plant intake are protected from water hammer by surge tanks.

See also

Hydroelectricity in Italy
List of pumped-storage hydroelectric power stations

References

External links

Pumped-storage hydroelectric power stations in Italy
Underground power stations
Buildings and structures in Piedmont
Dams in Italy
Arch-gravity dams
Gravity dams
Buildings and structures in the Province of Cuneo
Dams completed in 1982
Energy infrastructure completed in 1982
1982 establishments in Italy